The Wickham Mystery is a 1931 British mystery film directed by G. B. Samuelson and starring Eve Gray, John Longden and Lester Matthews. It was based on a play by John McNally. It was shot at Isleworth Studios in London and distributed by United Artists.

Cast
 Eve Gray as Joan Hamilton
 John Longden as Harry Crawford
 Lester Matthews as Charles Wickham
 Wallace Bosco as Edward Hamilton
 Sam Livesey as Inspector Cobb
 John Turnbull as Howard Clayton
 Doris Clemence as Mrs Wickham
 Walter Piers as George Beverley

References

Bibliography
 Low, Rachael. Filmmaking in 1930s Britain. George Allen & Unwin, 1985.
Wood, Linda. British Films, 1927–1939. British Film Institute, 1986.

External links

1931 films
British mystery films
1930s English-language films
Films directed by G. B. Samuelson
British black-and-white films
1931 mystery films
1930s British films
Films shot at Isleworth Studios
United Artists films